Luo Junqiang (1902 – February 22, 1970) was a politician of the Republic of China. He was born in Xiangtan, Hunan. In 1922, at the age of 20, Luo joined the Communist Party of China, but later left it to join the Kuomintang. He served in the government of Wang Jingwei in Nanjing during the Second Sino-Japanese War. After the downfall of Wang's government in 1945, Luo was arrested and imprisoned. He died in custody in Shanghai.

References

Bibliography
 
 
 

1902 births
1970 deaths
Republic of China politicians from Hunan
Chinese Communist Party politicians from Hunan
Chinese collaborators with Imperial Japan
Kuomintang collaborators with Imperial Japan
People of the Second Sino-Japanese War
Chinese people who died in prison custody
Politicians from Xiangtan
Prisoners who died in Chinese detention